Habach is a municipality in the Weilheim-Schongau district, in Bavaria, Germany.

References 

Weilheim-Schongau